Agua Brava Lagoon, (Laguna de Agua Brava) is a large coastal lagoon in Nayarit, Mexico.  Agua Brava Lagoon is drained into the Pacific Ocean by the Teacapan Estuary.

References

Lagoons of Mexico
Landforms of Nayarit
Pacific Coast of Mexico